Charles Frederick (22 November 1728 – 10 June 1811) was Margrave, Elector and later Grand Duke of Baden (initially only Margrave of Baden-Durlach) from 1738 until his death.

Biography
Born at Karlsruhe, he was the son of Hereditary Prince Frederick of Baden-Durlach and Amalia of Nassau-Dietz (13 October 1710 – 17 September 1777), the daughter of Johan Willem Friso of Nassau-Dietz.

He succeeded his grandfather as Margrave of Baden-Durlach in 1738 and ruled personally from 1746 until 1771, when he inherited Baden-Baden from the Catholic line of his family. This made him the Protestant ruler of a state that was overwhelmingly Catholic, however the Imperial Diet permitted this because the Elector of Saxony had converted to Catholicism from Lutheranism and had been permitted to retain control of the Protestant body of the Imperial Diet. Upon inheriting the latter margraviate, the original land of Baden was reunited. He was regarded as a good example of an enlightened despot, supporting schools, universities, jurisprudence, the civil service, the economy, culture, and urban development. He outlawed torture in 1767, and serfdom in 1783. He was elected a Royal Fellow of the Royal Society in 1747.

In 1803, Charles Frederick became Elector of Baden, and in 1806 the first Grand Duke of Baden. Through the politics of minister Sigismund Freiherr von Reitzenstein, Baden acquired the Bishopric of Constance, and the territories of the Bishopric of Basel, the Bishopric of Strassburg, and the Bishopric of Speyer that lay on the right bank of the Rhine, in addition to Breisgau and Ortenau.

In 1806, Baden joined the Confederation of the Rhine.

Together with his architect, Friedrich Weinbrenner, Charles Frederick was responsible for the construction of the handsome suite of classical buildings that distinguish Karlsruhe. He died there in 1811, and was one of the few German rulers to die during the Napoleonic era.

Marriages and children

Charles Frederick married Caroline Louise of Hesse-Darmstadt on 28 January 1751. She was the daughter of Louis VIII of Hesse-Darmstadt, was born on 11 July 1723 and died on 8 April 1783.

Charles Frederick and Caroline Louise had the following children:

Charles Louis, Hereditary Prince of Baden (14 February 1755 – 16 December 1801); his son, Charles, succeeded Charles Frederick as Grand Duke upon the latter's death in 1811.
Prince Frederick of Baden (29 August 1756 – 28 May 1817); married on 9 December 1791 Louise of Nassau-Usingen (16 August 1776 – 19 February 1829), the daughter of Duke Frederick of Nassau-Usingen.
Prince Louis of Baden (9 February 1763 – 30 March 1830); had three illegitimate children by Katharina Werner, created Countess of Gondelsheim and Langenstein in 1818.  Louis succeeded his nephew Charles as Louis I, 3rd Grand Duke in 1818.
 Son (29 July 1764 – 29 July 1764).
Princess Louise Auguste of Baden (8 January 1767 – 11 January 1767).

Charles Frederick married Louise Caroline, Baroness Geyer of Geyersberg as his second wife on 24 November 1787. She was the daughter of Lt. Col. Louis Henry Philipp, Baron Geyer of Geyersberg and his wife Maximiliana Christiane, Countess of Sponeck.  She was born on 26 May 1768 and died on 23 July 1820. This was a morganatic marriage, and the children born of it were not eligible to succeed.  Louise was created Baroness of Hochberg at the time of her marriage and Countess of Hochberg in 1796; both titles were also borne by her children.

They had the following children:
Prince Leopold of Baden (29 August 1790 – 24 April 1852); later succeeded as HRH Leopold I, Grand Duke of Baden. Married on 25 July 1819 in Karlsruhe his half-grand-niece, HRH Princess Sophie of Sweden (21 May 1801 – 6 July 1865), eldest daughter of the former King Gustav IV Adolf of Sweden and Frederica of Baden.
Prince William of Baden (8 April 1792 – 11 October 1859).
Prince Frederick Alexander of Baden (10 June 1793 – 18 June 1793).
Princess Amalie of Baden (26 January 1795 – 14 September 1869); married on 19 April 1818 Charles Egon II of Fürstenberg (28 October 1796 – 22 October 1854); their daughter, Princess Pauline von Fürstenberg, was the mother of Princess Margarethe of Hohenlohe-Öhringen (b. Slawentzitz, 27 December 1865 – d. Dresden, 13 June 1940), who was the second wife of Wilhelm, Count of Hohenau (himself a son of Prince Albert of Prussia
Prince Maximilian of Baden (8 December 1796 – 6 March 1882).

By 1817, the descendants of Charles Frederick by his first wife were dying out. To prevent Baden from being inherited by the next heir (his brother-in-law King Maximilian I Joseph of Bavaria), the reigning Grand Duke, Charles (grandson of the first Grand Duke), changed the succession law to give the Hochberg family full dynastic rights in Baden. They thus became Princes and Princesses of Baden with the style Grand Ducal Highness, like their elder half-siblings. Their succession rights were reinforced when Baden was granted a constitution in 1818, and recognised by Bavaria and the Great Powers in the Treaty of Frankfurt, 1819.  Leopold's descendants ruled the Grand Duchy of Baden until 1918. The current pretenders to the throne of Baden are descendants of Leopold.

Leopold, the eldest son from the second marriage, succeeded as Grand Duke in 1830.

Ancestry

References

Further reading
Helen P. Liebel, "Enlightened bureaucracy versus enlightened despotism in Baden, 1750-1792." Transactions of the American Philosophical Society 55.5 (1965): 1–132.

1728 births
1811 deaths
Nobility from Karlsruhe
Protestant monarchs
Grand Dukes of Baden
House of Zähringen
Margraves of Baden-Durlach
Margraves of Baden-Baden
Prince-electors of the Holy Roman Empire
Fellows of the Royal Society